St. Joseph's Church and Complex is a historic church built in 1906, and located at 1401–1415 Howard Street in the South of Market neighborhood of San Francisco, California, United States. 

It was added to the National Register of Historic Places on January 15, 1982; and added to the list of San Francisco Designated Landmarks in October 5, 1980.

History 
The Romanesque Revival structure was built in 1906 and designed by architect John J. Foley; it once served as both the Catholic church and a school. Most of the parishioners at the time of founding were Irish, and by 1979, most of the parishioners were Filipino. The building was damaged after the 1989 Loma Prieta earthquake. 

In 2018, the 22,000-square-foot building was renovated and re-imaged as the Saint Joseph's Arts Society run by the Saint Joseph's Arts Foundation, a nonprofit 501(c)(3) subscriber-based arts center led by Ken Fulk.

References

External links 
 Saint Joseph's Arts Foundation website
 Image: Interior before renovation (1933) from the San Francisco Historical Photograph Collection at the San Francisco Public Library

Roman Catholic churches in San Francisco
Churches on the National Register of Historic Places in California
Roman Catholic churches completed in 1914
Roman Catholic churches in California
San Francisco Designated Landmarks
Romanesque Revival church buildings in California
National Register of Historic Places in San Francisco
20th-century Roman Catholic church buildings in the United States